Paris–Tours Espoirs is a French single-day road cycling race held every October from the outskirts of Paris to the cathedral city of Tours. It is organised by the Amaury Sport Organisation.

The race is held as a 1.2U race on the UCI Europe Tour – for riders 23 years old or under – and is held on the same day as the elite Paris–Tours event; although this is held over a longer course than the espoir race.

Winners

References

External links
 

Cycle races in France
UCI Europe Tour races
Recurring sporting events established in 1991
1991 establishments in France